Dave Millard (born 26 November 1979 in Fiji) is a Fijian-born former Scotland 7s international rugby union footballer. He played professionally for Glasgow Warriors. His regular playing position was on the wing.

Born in Fiji but brought up in Scotland, Millard went to Merchiston Castle School in Edinburgh. He went to Aberdeen University to study marine biology and zoology and played for Aberdeen GSFP.

The wing came through the Scotland age-grade international setup. Millard played internationally for Scotland 7s in 2005. Millard played in the IRB AXA International Sevens tournament in Wellington, New Zealand but suffered a hamstring tear on his debut.

He also played club rugby in New Zealand.

He signed for the professional provincial side Glasgow Warriors in 2003. He played there for two seasons. He was released in March 2005 and once again signed for Aberdeen GSFP

For 2005-06 season, he joined Coventry.

He returned to Scotland in 2006 to join Glasgow Hawks.

Millard joined Falkirk RFC in 2009. He retired from playing in 2011.

Reference list

External links
ESPN Scotland 7s squad

1979 births
Living people
People educated at Merchiston Castle School
Glasgow Warriors players
Aberdeen GSFP RFC players
Coventry R.F.C. players
Glasgow Hawks players
Falkirk RFC players
Scottish rugby union players
Scotland international rugby sevens players
Male rugby sevens players
Rugby union wings